Life - Fear Not (Chinese: 人生无所畏, previously titled Life's Blessings) ran for 120 episode series produced by Mediacorp Channel 8. It stars Chen Shucheng , Aileen Tan , Rayson Tan , Felicia Chin & Aloysius Pang as the casts of this series.

The show replaced the second half of the 7.00 pm drama timeslot, airing weekdays from October 19, 2015, 7.30 pm to 8.00 pm on weekdays  making it the 2nd long form half an hour drama  airing together with news-current affairs programme Hello Singapore at 6.30pm.

Cast

Zhuang (Shuiqing) family

 Chen Shucheng as Zhuang Shuiqing (庄水清) who owns Our Humble Lodge

Peng Chu'er's Family

Liu Yishou's Family

Our Humble Lodge

Zhi Li Secondary School

YES 933

Bai Meigui's Family

Lu Guoli's Family

Narrator

Cameo Appearances

Missing but mentioned

Awards & Nominations

Star Awards 2017
Life - Fear Not is nominated for 2 categories at Star Awards 2017.

The other drama serials that are nominated for Best Theme Song are You Can Be an Angel 2, The Dream Job, Eat Already? & If Only I Could (TV series).

It did not won a single nomination.

Original Sound Track (OST)

Controversy
Malaysia's satellite channel Astro AEC had already began to air the show the same day as Singapore, which mirrors that of Astro Shuang Xing's First Global Premiere plan. This is already controversial, since Mind Game, which was the first drama under the plan, did not perform well in Singapore and is also nominated for only one technical award in Star Awards 2016. In addition, only Super Senior and The Dream Makers II were the only dramas in the plan to win performance categories.

References

Singapore Chinese dramas
2015 Singaporean television series debuts
2016 Singaporean television series endings
Channel 8 (Singapore) original programming